Trine Pilskog (born 1 December 1972) is a Norwegian middle-distance runner. She was born in Hareid.

She was Norwegian champion in 1500 metres in 1997.
She competed in the 1,500 m at the 2004 Summer Olympics in Athens.

References

External links

1972 births
Living people
People from Hareid
UTEP Miners women's track and field athletes
Norwegian female middle-distance runners
Athletes (track and field) at the 2004 Summer Olympics
Olympic athletes of Norway
Sportspeople from Møre og Romsdal